Don't Drink the Water may refer to:

Film, theatre, and television
 Don't Drink the Water (play), a 1966 play by Woody Allen
 Don't Drink the Water (1969 film), a film adaptation of the play starring Jackie Gleason
 Don't Drink the Water (1994 film), a television movie by Allen, adapted from his play 
 Don't Drink the Water (TV series), a 1974–75 UK sitcom, a spin-off from On the Buses
 Don't Drink the Water (game show), a programme on the UK channel Challenge
 "Don't Drink the Water" (Alienators: Evolution Continues), a television episode
 "Don't Drink the Water" (Ben 10), a television episode

Songs
 "Don't Drink the Water" (Dave Matthews Band song), 1998
 "Don't Drink the Water" (Stone Gods song), 2008
 "Don't Drink the Water", by Brad Paisley from This Is Country Music, 2011
 "Don't Drink the Water", by Colin Hay from Wayfaring Sons, 1990
 "Don't Drink the Water", by Joe Cocker from Cocker, 1986
 "Don't Drink the Water", by Justin Townes Earle from The Saint of Lost Causes, 2019
 "Don't Drink the Water", by Tears for Fears from Raoul and the Kings of Spain, 1995

Other uses
 Don't Drink the Water, a 2006 album by Krum (recording as Playdough)
 "Don't Drink the Water", a short story by Jeffrey Archer included in his 2006 collection Cat O'Nine Tales